La Longine is a commune in the Haute-Saône department in the region of Bourgogne-Franche-Comté in eastern France.

The village of La Longine is a small village located east of France. It is located in the canton of Mélisey and of the arrondissement of Lure. The area code for La Longine is 70308 (also known as code INSEE), and the zip code is 70310.

Demography 
The population of La Longine was 255 in 2007 and the population density was 20.56 inhabitants per km2. The number of housing units in La Longine was 162 in 2007. These homes consist of 113 residences, 37 second or occasional homes and 12 vacant homes.

See also
Communes of the Haute-Saône department

References

Communes of Haute-Saône